Victoria Tyumneva (born 6 February 1990) is a track cyclist from  Russia. She represented her nation at the 2015 UCI Track Cycling World Championships.

Major results
2015
Grand Prix Minsk
1st Team Sprint (with Elena Brejniva)
2nd Keirin
2nd Sprint
2nd Keirin, Panevezys
3rd Team Sprint, Grand Prix of Tula (with Elena Brejniva)

References

External links
 profile at Cyclingarchives.com

1990 births
Russian female cyclists
Living people
Place of birth missing (living people)